Siddhartha Roy (born April 1, 1954) is an Indian structural biologist, biophysicist, former director of the Indian Institute of Chemical Biology and the former director (officiating) of Bose Institute. Widely known for his studies on bacteriophage lambda and protein synthesis, he is an elected fellow of the Indian Academy of Sciences and the Indian National Science Academy. In 1999, the Council of Scientific and Industrial Research, the apex agency of the Government of India for scientific research, awarded him the Shanti Swarup Bhatnagar Prize for Science and Technology, for his contributions to Biological sciences.

Biography 
Roy was born in the Indian state of West Bengal, completed his schooling at Ballygunge Government High School, then obtained a first class honours degree in chemistry (BSc Hons) from Presidency College, Calcutta in 1974 and did his doctoral studies at the University of Delaware under the guidance of Prof. Roberta F. Colman to secure a PhD in 1981. His post-doctoral studies were at Brandeis University at the laboratory of Prof. Alfred Redfield (1981–82) and at the National Institutes of Health (1982–86). Returning to India in 1986, he joined Bose Institute, Kolkata as a senior lecturer in the department of biophysics. He served the Institute till 2004 holding positions of reader and then professor of biophysics when he moved to the Indian Institute of Chemical Biology (IICB) as its director. After completing 10 years as the director of IICB,  he returned to Bose Institute in 2014 as a senior professor and dean of studies. While at IICB, he has served the nation in several different high-level capacities such as the founder-director-in-charge of the National Institute of Pharmaceutical Education and Research, Kolkata (NIPER) (2007–14), the cluster director of 11 Biological institutes of the Council of Scientific and Industrial Research (CSIR) (2009–14), member of the governing body of the CSIR and as a visiting professor at Osaka University (2012). He has served as the president of the West Bengal Academy of Science and Technology. He is the founder-president of the Chemical Biology Society of India. He currently serves as a member of the board of directors of the International Chemical Biology Society. He also served as the director (officiating) of Bose Institute during the critical Centenary year. In addition, Roy played the very crucial role as an advisory committee member to successfully conduct the 'International Conference on Genome Biology 2019' hosted by the School of Biological Sciences (SBS), Madurai Kamaraj University.

Legacy 
Roy's researches during his stint in the US was on protein folding and nuclear magnetic resonance studies of DNA and those researches identified the first hydropathy model which helped in predicting the exteriors and interiors of proteins by analyzing sequence information. He is also reported to have performed the complete assignment of a nucleic acid imino proton spectra using Nuclear Overhauser effect, regio-specific isotope labeling of sugars in nucleic acids and working along with Ad Bax and R. H. Griffey, developed an indirect 2D-NMR detection method, all reported to be for the first time. Later focusing his attention on bacteriophage lambda, he studied the gene expression of the bacterial virus using its operator-repressor system. Through his collaborative work with Sankar Adhya in 1998, he elucidated the role of differential contact in the transcription regulation mechanism and demonstrated the theory in many genetic regulatory circuits. His current work is focused on peptide therapeutics and he holds patents for some of his work.

Roy has published his research work through a number of articles published in peer-reviewed journals and ResearchGate, an online repository of scientific papers, has listed 155 of them. He is the Co-author of "Chemical Biology of the Genome" published by Elsevier/AP. He is a joint editor of Subcellular Biochemistry, volume on Proteins: Structure, Function, and Engineering published by Plenum Press, New York, USA and Protein-Protein interaction Regulators published by Royal Society of Chemistry, UK. He has guided around 30 scholars in their doctoral studies. When the Chemical Biology Society of India was formed in 2013, he became its founder president and holds the position. He is a former president of the West Bengal Academy of Science and Technology and is its incumbent vice president.

Awards and honours 
The Indian Academy of Sciences elected Roy as their fellow in 1996 and the Council of Scientific and Industrial Research awarded him the Shanti Swarup Bhatnagar Prize, one of the highest Indian science awards, in 1999. A recipient of the Meritorious Service Award of the United States Department of Health and Human Services, he was elected by the Indian National Science Academy as a fellow in 2005. In 2007, he was elected as a fellow of the West Bengal Academy of Science and Technology and he received the J. C. Bose National Fellowship of the Science and Engineering Research Board as well as the Tata Innovation Fellowship of the Department of Biotechnology the same year. He was also a member of Guha Research Conference during the years 1992 and 2012. He is a Fellow of the Royal Society of Chemistry, UK and has been elected a member of The World Academy of Sciences (FTWAS).

Books 
Chemical Biology of the Genome by Siddhartha Roy & Tapas Kundu. 2021. Published by Elsevier/AP. 
Protein-Protein interaction Regulators, edited by Siddhartha Roy & Haian Fu. 2021. Published by Royal Society of Chemistry, UK
Subcellular Biochemistry, Volume 24 on Proteins: Structure, Function, and Engineering, edited by B B Biswas & Siddhartha Roy. 1995. Published by Plenum Press, New York, USA.

Selected bibliography

Patents 
The list is incomplete.

See also

Notes

References

External links 
 

Recipients of the Shanti Swarup Bhatnagar Award in Biological Science
1954 births
Living people
Indian scientific authors
20th-century Indian biologists
Phage workers
Fellows of the Indian National Science Academy
University of Calcutta alumni
Presidency University, Kolkata alumni
University of Delaware alumni
Brandeis University alumni
National Institutes of Health people
Council of Scientific and Industrial Research
Academic staff of Osaka University
Scientists from West Bengal
Indian patent holders